The 2014–15 Irish Cup was the 135th edition of the premier knock-out cup competition in Northern Irish football since its introduction in 1881. The competition began on 23 August 2014 with the first round, and concluded on 2 May 2015 with the final. For the first time since 1995, the Oval was chosen as the final venue following the discovery of damage to a stand at Windsor Park during the stadium's redevelopment.

Glenavon were the defending champions, following their 2–1 win over Ballymena United in the 2014 final. However, this season they were eliminated in the sixth round after a shock 2–0 defeat to second-tier side Harland & Wolff Welders.

Glentoran were the eventual cup winners for the second time in three seasons and the 22nd time overall by defeating Portadown 1–0 in the final, and subsequently qualified for the 2015–16 UEFA Europa League first qualifying round.

Format and Schedule
125 clubs entered this season's competition, an increase of six clubs compared with the 2013–14 total of 119 clubs. Initially there had been 128 entrants, however three clubs – Draperstown Celtic, Lisanally Rangers and Mountjoy United – all withdrew after the first round draw had been made, with Lisanally Rangers later dissolving.

80 regional league clubs from tiers 4–7 in the Northern Ireland football league system entered the competition in the first round. A further 4 clubs proceeded directly into the second round; one club received a bye (necessitated by the number of participants), while the other 3 clubs had no first round matches after their opponents withdrew from the competition. These clubs contested the first three rounds, with the 11 surviving clubs joining the 29 NIFL Championship clubs in the fourth round.

The 12 NIFL Premiership clubs then entered the competition in the fifth round, along with the 20 winners from the fourth round matches. In a major change to the rules from previous seasons, replays were abolished. All ties level after 90 minutes used extra time to determine the winner, with a penalty shoot-out to follow if necessary.

Results
The league tier of each club at the time of entering the competition is listed in parentheses.

First round
The draw for the first round was made on 29 July 2014 with the matches played on 23 August 2014. Markethill Swifts received a bye into the second round. After the draw was made, Draperstown Celtic, Lisanally Rangers and Mountjoy United withdrew, and their first round opponents subsequently proceeded to the second round.

Note: All entrants at this stage were at regional level (tiers 4–7).

|-

|}
Source: irishfa.com

Second round
The draw for the second round took place on 1 September 2014, with the matches played on 4 October 2014. The 40 winners from the first round matches entered this round, along with Abbey Villa, Banbridge Rangers, Holywood and Markethill Swifts.

Note: All entrants at this stage were at regional level (tiers 4–7).

|-

|}
Source: irishfa.com

Third round
The draw for the third round took place on 6 October 2014, with the matches played on 8, 15 and 29 November 2014. The 22 winners from the second round entered this round.

Note: All entrants at this stage were at regional level (tiers 4–7).

|-
|colspan="3" style="background:#E8FFD8;"|8 November 2014

|-
|colspan="3" style="background:#E8FFD8;"|15 November 2014

|-
|colspan="3" style="background:#E8FFD8;"|29 November 2014

|}
Source: irishfa.com

Fourth round
The fourth round draw was made on 10 November 2014, with the matches played on 6 December 2014. The 11 winners from the third round matches entered this round, along with the 29 NIFL Championship clubs. 1st Bangor Old Boys were the lowest ranked team to reach this round – the only representatives as low as the sixth tier of the Northern Ireland football league system that still remained in the competition. However, the run came to an end after a 3–0 defeat to Annagh United.

Note: Intermediate clubs from tiers 2 and 3 entered the competition at this stage.

|-

|}
Source: irishfa.com

Fifth round
The draw for the fifth round took place on 17 December 2014, with the games played on 10 and 20 January 2015. The 20 winners from the fourth round matches entered this round, along with the 12 NIFL Premiership clubs. The 5 clubs from the fourth tier that made it through to this round were the lowest ranked clubs remaining in the competition.

Note: Senior clubs from tier 1 entered the competition at this stage.

Sixth Round
The sixth round draw took place after the fifth round matches had been played, with the fixtures played on 7 February 2015. The 16 winners from the fifth-round matches entered this round. Third-tier club Portstewart were the lowest-ranked side to reach this stage of the competition.

Linfield's home tie against Warrenpoint Town was initially delayed until 16 February 2015 to allow time for an IFA investigation into allegations that a Warrenpoint Town player, Darren Forsyth, who had played in the 3–1 win over Coleraine in the previous round may have been ineligible. In the event of Forsyth being deemed as ineligible, Warrenpoint Town would have faced expulsion from the competition, with Coleraine reinstated as Linfield's sixth round opponents. However, the IFA later cleared Forsyth to play. At the request of both clubs, the match was rescheduled back to its original date of 7 February 2015.

Quarter-finals
The quarter-final draw took place on 7 February 2015 after the sixth round matches had been played, with the matches played on 28 February 2015. The 8 winners of the sixth round matches entered the quarter-finals. Carrick Rangers and Harland & Wolff Welders were the lowest ranked sides to reach the quarter-finals, as the only two clubs from outside the top-flight remaining in the competition.

Semi-finals
The 4 quarter-final winners entered the semi-finals, with the matches played on 21 March 2015 at neutral venues.

Final
On 2 May 2015, the final was played at the Oval, Belfast for the first time since 1995. It was switched from the usual venue following the discovery of damage to a stand at Windsor Park. Glentoran had reached the final for the second time in three seasons, after winning the cup in 2013. Portadown had last reached the final in 2010, when they lost 2–1 against Linfield. It was only the third ever meeting between the two sides in the final, with Glentoran being the victors on both previous occasions. In fact, Portadown had never scored a goal against the Glens in a final, losing 3–0 in 1990 and 1–0 in the last meeting in 2000. The trend continued, with Glentoran winning once again without conceding a goal, to lift the cup for the 22nd time overall.

References

External links
 Official site
 nifootball.co.uk

2014-15
Cup
Irish Cup